Pseudomegacoelum is a genus of mostly European capsid bugs in the tribe Mirini, erected by Chérot and Malipatil in 2016.  The type species, Pseudomegacoelum beckeri (previously placed in genus Megacoelum) is recorded from northern Europe including the British Isles.

Species 
According to BioLib the following are included:
 Pseudomegacoelum angustum (Wagner, 1965)
 Pseudomegacoelum beckeri (Fieber, 1870)- type species (as Calocoris beckeri Fieber, 1870)
 Pseudomegacoelum irbilanum (Linnavuori, 1988)
 Pseudomegacoelum quercicola (Linnavuori, 1965)

References

External links
 

Miridae genera
Hemiptera of Europe
Mirini